St. Johns School District may refer to:
 St. Johns Unified School District (Arizona)
 St. Johns County School District (Florida)

See also
 St. Thomas-St. John School District (U.S. Virgin Islands)